MV Seabourn Odyssey is a cruise ship for Seabourn Cruise Line. The ship's keel was laid at the CIMAR Shipyard in on 15 July 2007. Its hull was the first one built at the brand new shipyard. Seabourn Odyssey was outfitted at the T. Mariotti shipyard in Genoa, Italy. When it was commissioned in 2009, it was the first new ship for Seabourn in over a decade. The ship was completed in May 2009, a few weeks earlier than planned. The ship undertook sea trials on 22 May 2009 and the naming ceremony took place in Venice, Italy on 24 June 2009. Seabourn Odyssey was delivered by T. Mariotti on 29 June 2009 and was reported to have cost 550 million euros. 

A sister ship, was launched in 2010.

In June 2017, Seabourn Odyssey completed a five day interior refit by Trimline. Staterooms, restrooms and a restaurant were refreshed. 

In July 2019 the ship completed another refit, billed as a "technology and design update". The ship was drydocked in Genoa for ten days, allowing the contractor to refit public areas as well as some suites. 

In March 2023, it was announced the ship was sold to Mitsui O.S.K. Lines, Ltd. (MOL) and would complete all published itineraries through August 2024 and the ship would be turned over after.

Operational history 

On 24 June 2008, Seabourn announced that they had appointed Captain Karlo Buer to be the ship's commander. The ship sailed on her first trip with guests on 25 June 2009, the day after her naming ceremony. The maiden voyage was a 14-night cruise to Istanbul. Its first season was spent in the Mediterranean Sea.  

The ship's maiden World Cruise begun on 5 January 2010 and was scheduled to visit 42 ports over 108 days.

Passenger amenities 
The ship includes 11 decks with two swimming pools, six outdoor whirlpools, a spa and a marina. The Retreat features a nine-hole mini golf course, a giant chess board and shuffleboard. Onboard are four restaurants. At the time of its launch, Seabourn claimed that the ship had "the largest spa on any luxury vessel at 11,400 square feet" and one of the highest ratios of space onboard per guest. 

As of 2022, Seabourn Odyssey had 229 suites and offered offered four different types of suites to passengers:

 Ocean View Suite
 Veranda Suite
 Penthouse Suite
 Owner's Suite and above

References

Notes

Bibliography

External links 

 

Ships of Seabourn Cruise Line
Ships built in Genoa
Ships built by T. Mariotti
2009 ships